Schöpflin is a surname. Notable people with the surname include:

 Emil Schöpflin (1910–?), German cyclist
 György Schöpflin (1939–2021), Hungarian academic and politician
 Johann Daniel Schöpflin (1694–1771), German historian